Sovetskaya Sibir is a newspaper published in Novosibirsk, Russia.

History
At first the newspaper was published in Chelyabinsk on October 1, 1919. The first editor was V. I. Khotimsky (September 1919 – June 1920). It was the newspaper of the Sibrevkom.

From November 26, 1919 to June 12, 1921 "Sovetskaya Sibir" was published in Omsk. Then the editorial board of the newspaper moved to Novonikolayevsk (current Novosibirsk) together with Sibrevkom. The first issue of the Novikolayevsk newspaper was released on June 23, 1921.

See also
 Vecherniy Novosibirsk

References

External links
 Старейшая из газет. Библиотека сибирского краеведения.
"Sovetskaya Sibir" digital archives in "Newspapers on the web and beyond", the digital resource of the National Library of Russia
"Sovetskaya Sibir" digital archives in "Siberian periodicals", the digital resource of the Novosibirsk State Regional Scientific Library

Newspapers published in Novosibirsk
Russian-language newspapers published in Russia